Anbar Olum, also Romanized as Anbār Olūm and Anbār Olom) is a city and capital of Voshmgir District, in Aqqala County, Golestan Province, in northern Iran.  At the 2006 census, its population was 5,859, in 1,247 families.

References

Populated places in Aqqala County

Cities in Golestan Province